William James Perver Stewart (born 31 August 1934 in Llanelly) is a former first-class cricketer. He played for Warwickshire from 1955 to 1969, and for Northamptonshire in 1971 and 1972.

Life and career
Jim Stewart was born in Wales and his family moved to Warwickshire when he was a boy. He made his first-class debut for Warwickshire in 1955 and played frequently without establishing his place until 1959, when he scored 1799 runs at an average of 40.88 with five centuries. He hit four of those centuries in five innings. Against Lancashire he set a world first-class record by hitting 17 sixes in the match. A tall, powerfully built opening batsman, he was an especially strong driver.

He had another successful season in 1960, with 1764 runs at an average of 42.00. He was selected to tour New Zealand in 1960-61 with a team of young English players, making 354 runs in the first-class matches at 39.33 and playing in all three unofficial Tests against New Zealand. His most successful season was 1962, when he scored 2318 runs, including 2100 runs at 42.85 in the County Championship. His seven centuries that year included his highest score, when he made 182 not out and 79 not out in the victory over Leicestershire.

A broken big toe on his left foot, which led to the toe's amputation, hampered his progress for the next few years, and he was also held back by an operation for arthritis in his right hand. Nevertheless, he still exceeded 1000 runs in 1965 and 1968. After leaving Warwickshire at the end of the 1969 season he played a few matches for Northamptonshire in the John Player League in 1971 and 1972, but with little success.

He was also a rugby union player who played at full back in three of the Warwickshire teams that won the rugby union County Championship.

He and his wife Frances were married in Coventry in November 1960.

References

External links
 
 

1934 births
Living people
A. E. R. Gilligan's XI cricketers
Cricketers from Monmouthshire
English rugby union players
Marylebone Cricket Club cricketers
Non-international England cricketers
Northamptonshire cricketers
Rugby union players from Monmouthshire
Warwickshire cricketers
Welsh cricketers